Laminacauda montevidensis is a species of sheet weaver found in Argentina, Brazil and Uruguay. It was described by Keyserling in 1878.

References

Linyphiidae
Spiders of South America
Spiders described in 1878